Enarmonodes is a genus of moths belonging to the subfamily Tortricinae of the family Tortricidae.

Species
Enarmonodes aeologlypta (Meyrick, 1936)
Enarmonodes aino Kuznetzov, 1968
Enarmonodes kunashirica Kuznetzov, 1969
Enarmonodes recreantana (Kennel, 1900)

See also
List of Tortricidae genera

References

External links
Tortricid.net

Tortricidae genera
Olethreutinae